Horrid Red is a rock band formed in 2010 in San Francisco, California. It features German vocalist Bunker Wolf, as well as instrumentalists Edmund Xavier and Clay Ruby. The band has released four studio albums: Celestial Joy (2011), Nightly Wreaths (2012), Gold of Days (2014), and Radiant Life (2020).

Described as a post-punk and dark wave band, Horrid Red "mixes dark new-wave with a pop sensibility," incorporating a "noirish krautrock and fuzz-wreathed songcraft." The band cites Cabaret Voltaire, Savage Republic, The Fall, Public Image Ltd. and Can as influences. The band's lyrics are sung in German.

Members
 Bunker Wolf - vocals
 Edmund Xavier - instruments
 Clay Ruby - instruments

Discography
Studio albums
 Celestial Joy (2011)
 Nightly Wreaths (2012)
 Gold of Days (2014)
 Radiant Life (2020)
EPs
 Empty Lungs (2010)
 Pink Flowers (2011)
 Silent Party (2011)
 Banquet in Blue (2012)
 Who Made the World (2013)

References

External links

2010 establishments in California
Musical groups from San Francisco
Rock music groups from California
American musical trios
American post-punk music groups
American new wave musical groups
American dark wave musical groups